Heinsenia is a monotypic genus of plants, shrubs or small trees growing in Africa. Its only species is Heinsenia diervilleoides. The Royal Botanic Gardens, Kew collected a specimen.

References

Ixoroideae
Flora of Africa
Rubiaceae genera